Scardinius plotizza is a species of ray-finned fish in the family Cyprinidae.
It is found in Bosnia and Herzegovina and Croatia. Its natural habitats are rivers and freshwater lakes.

References

Scardinius
Fish described in 1858